Wala is an inhabited islet off the north-eastern coast of Malakula in Vanuatu in the Pacific Ocean. The 1999 census showed a population of 201, which increased in 2009 to 270. Cruise ships anchor off-shore and passengers visit the Wala by the ship's tender.

References

External links
, Pacific Sun, 2008

Islands of Vanuatu
Malampa Province